The black banded gecko (Coleonyx fasciatus) is a gecko endemic to western Mexico. It is found in Madrean foothills in Sinaloa and southern Sonora, and perhaps in extreme adjacent southwestern Chihuahua.

References

Coleonyx
Reptiles of Mexico
Reptiles described in 1885